Mashhad (also known as Mashhad Teshān) is a village in Tashan-e Sharqi Rural District, Tashan District, Behbahan County, Khuzestan Province, Iran. At the 2006 census, its population was 461, in 93 families.

References 

Populated places in Behbahan County